Lyubavichi is the name of several rural localities in Russia:
Lyubavichi, Monastyrshchinsky District, Smolensk Oblast, a village in Lyubavichskoye Rural Settlement of Monastyrshchinsky District in Smolensk Oblast
Lyubavichi, Rudnyansky District, Smolensk Oblast, a village in Lyubavichskoye Rural Settlement of Rudnyansky District in Smolensk Oblast